Yulia Ilinykh (born 6 October 1985) is a Russian former professional road cyclist. She was the winner of the 2009 Russian National Road Race Championships, and she also won the 2014 Grand Prix of Maykop.

Major results

2009
 1st  Road race, National Road Championships
2011
 5th Overall Tour de Bretagne Féminin
 5th Overall Tour Féminin en Limousin
 8th Novilon Eurocup Ronde van Drenthe
2013
 5th Grand Prix of Maykop
2014
 1st Grand Prix of Maykop
2015
 3rd Overall Vuelta a Burgos Feminas
1st Points classification
1st Stages 2 & 3
 6th Road race, Military World Games

References

External links

1985 births
Russian female cyclists
Living people
Place of birth missing (living people)
21st-century Russian women